Henricus ("Harry") Carolus Gerardus Lubse (born 23 September 1951 in Eindhoven, North Brabant) is a retired football striker from the Netherlands, who obtained one international cap for the Dutch national team. He did so on September 3, 1975 in the Euro Qualifier against Finland, when Holland won 4–1 with one goal from the PSV Eindhoven forward. He represented his native country at the 1978 FIFA World Cup, although Lubse didn't play in Argentina. Later moving from PSV he played for Helmond Sport.

References

External links

1951 births
Living people
Dutch footballers
Dutch expatriate footballers
Netherlands international footballers
Association football forwards
Eerste Divisie players
Eredivisie players
PSV Eindhoven players
1978 FIFA World Cup players
Helmond Sport players
SBV Vitesse players
K. Beerschot V.A.C. players
Belgian Pro League players
Expatriate footballers in Belgium
Dutch expatriate sportspeople in Belgium
Footballers from Eindhoven
UEFA Cup winning players